Sir John Dugdale Astley, 1st Baronet (27 June 1778 – 19 January 1842) was an English politician.

He was Member of Parliament for Wiltshire from 1820 to 1832, and for North Wiltshire from 1832 to 1835.

He was created a baronet, of Everleigh, in the county of Wiltshire on 15 August 1821. He was appointed High Sheriff of Wiltshire in 1836.

See also
 Astley baronets

References

Attribution:

External links

1778 births
1842 deaths
Baronets in the Baronetage of the United Kingdom
High Sheriffs of Wiltshire
Members of the Parliament of the United Kingdom for Wiltshire
UK MPs 1820–1826
UK MPs 1826–1830
UK MPs 1830–1831
UK MPs 1831–1832
UK MPs 1832–1835